Jean-Louis Kralik (1813, Strasbourg – 1892, Tresserve) was a French botanist.

He worked as a professor in Strasbourg, and for a period of time was curator of Philip Barker Webb's herbarium. From 1855 to 1885 he was curator of Ernest Cosson's herbarium. As a botanical collector, he conducted extensive investigation of North African flora on expeditions to Algeria, Tunisia and Egypt.

The genus Kralikia (synonym Tripogon) was named in his honor by Cosson and Michel Charles Durieu de Maisonneuve.

Published works 
 Catalogue des plantes observées en Syrie et en Palestine de décembre 1850 à avril 1851, (with Louis Félicien de Saulcy, Ernest Cosson and Jean-Hippolyte Michon) - Catalog of plants seen in Syria and Palestine from December 1850 to April 1851.
 Notes sur quelques plantes rares ou nouvelles : recueillies, en 1854, par M.L. Kralik dans le sud de la régence de Tunis, (with Ernest Cosson); 1857 - Notes on some new and rare plants, collected in 1854 in the south of the Régence de Tunis.
 Catalogue Des Reliquiae Mailleanae (1869) - A catalogue of the herbarium collections of Alphonse Maille.

References

External links 
 IPNI List of plants described and co-described by Kralik.

1813 births
1892 deaths
19th-century French botanists
Scientists from Strasbourg